Karl Strandman (born 9 April 1961) is a Swedish sailor. He competed in the Tornado event at the 1988 Summer Olympics.

References

External links
 

1961 births
Living people
Swedish male sailors (sport)
Olympic sailors of Sweden
Sailors at the 1988 Summer Olympics – Tornado
Sportspeople from Västerås